Kenneth "Kenny" Caceros (born April 6, 1988) is a Canadian soccer player who plays for Gloucester Celtic.

Early life
Caceros was born in Ottawa to a Guatemalan father. He played for the Ottawa Fury's Super Y-League club as a teenager, earning a scholarship to Syracuse University. He played for the Orange for four years before returning to Ottawa to play for the Fury's PDL club, where he played three seasons.

Club career
Caceros began his professional career with Capital City F.C., based in his hometown of Ottawa, in their inaugural season in the Canadian Soccer League. He played a key role in a team that included many of his former Ottawa Fury youth teammates, and helped the club to a 3rd-place league finish and a trip to the playoff final.

In March, 2012 he was signed by FC Edmonton of the NASL. He played in 24 of Edmonton's 28 NASL matches in the 2012 season, as well as one Canadian Championship match. In 2013, Caceros split his time between the Harrisburg City Islanders of the USL Pro league and Kingston FC of the Canadian Soccer League, helping to guide Kingston FC to the 2013 CSL league championship.

Had a trial with the New York Cosmos of the NASL.

References

External links
 Syracuse University bio

1988 births
Living people
Canadian soccer players
Canadian expatriate soccer players
FC Edmonton players
Penn FC players
North American Soccer League players
Ottawa Fury (2005–2013) players
Ottawa Fury FC players
Canadian people of Guatemalan descent
Canadian sportspeople of North American descent
Sportspeople of Guatemalan descent
Soccer players from Ottawa
Syracuse Orange men's soccer players
USL League Two players
USL Championship players
Canadian Soccer League (1998–present) players
Kingston FC players
Association football defenders
Association football midfielders